Sir Eynion de Tilston (born c. 1126) was a Norman knight and first lord of the manor of Tilston in the English county of Cheshire.

Lord of Tilston
In the 12th century, William de Malpas gave Eynion the manor of Tilston in Cheshire, near the Welsh border. Sir Eynion was given the Manor of Tilston by the Earl of Chester in return for military service. He and his descendants were constantly alert, because of Welsh raids upon the border areas.

Marriage, family and descendants
In 1154 he married Beatrix de Gernons, daughter of Ranulf de Gernon, Earl of Chester. They had at least one son born around 1156. The name of his son is unknown (possibly Einion de Tilston born @1156 ref: Geneanet.org).

Beatrix de Gernons was a sister of Hugh of Kevelioc, and a great-granddaughter of Henry I Beauclerc, son of William The Conqueror and Matilda of Flanders. Great-great-great-great-granddaughter of Richard III De Normandie[Grandfather or William the Conqueror]

Sir Eynion de Tilston has several notable family members:

One of his descendants was John Tillotson, Archbishop of Canterbury (1691–1694).

Flight Officer Norman Tilston DFC Royal Canadian Air Force, Raf Lissett, 158 Squadron, Yorkshire, England.
Tribute website – www.normantilston.moonfruit.com
 

Steve Tilston – British folk singer-songwriter.

Resources
Descent from Richard de Tilston to Philip Robert Burns
Tilson Genealogy 
Cheshire towns and villages  including Tilston

1120s births
Anglo-Normans
Anglo-Normans in Wales
Norman warriors
Medieval English knights
People from Cheshire West and Chester
Year of death unknown